Get Blake! (formerly Blake and the Aliens) is a French-American animated television series created by Antonie Guilbaud and produced by Marathon Media and Nickelodeon Productions. The show aired on both Gulli and Nickelodeon in France.

According to Marathon Media, the show was its first "broad comedy series" following "years of doing light—hearted action such as Totally Spies! or Martin Mystery." Get Blake! ended on October 29, 2015 with a total of 26 episodes.

Plot
The series tracks the exploits of Blake Myers, an adventurous teenage boy who is destined to one day to protect humanity from alien squirrels called "Squaliens". The Squaliens, however, are sent back in time to prevent Blake from fulfilling this destiny.

Characters
Blake Myers (Robbie Daymond) — Blake is a 13-year-old boy who dreams to become a space ranger. He is skilled at parkour which helps in escaping the Squaliens. Has a strong sympathy for Leonard
Mitch de la Cruz (Spike Spencer) — Blake's Mexican American best friend who cherishes nothing more than their friendship and gets jealous whenever Blake's attention is diverted to someone else
Maxus (John T. Fisher) — The bossiest and shortest of the Squalien trio, Jerome's brother and the General's nephew
Jerome (Danny Katiana) — The dimwit of the Squalien trio who is Maxus' brother and the General's nephew
Leonard (Kevin Glikmann) — The genius and self-appointed leader of the Squalien trio. He is always the one who invents the gadgets necessary for their missions
Squalien General (Kevin Glikmann) — The Squaliens' commander who sent Leonard, Jerome and Maxus from the future to apprehend Blake. As Maxus and Jerome's uncle, he mostly takes their side and doubts Leonard
Zorka — The resident contractor and also Roy's guardian
Skye Gunderson (Katie Leigh) — Blake's neighbor as well as his love interest. She also volunteers as a dental nurse helping her father.
Roy Cronk (Faruq Tauheed) — The cranky neighbor whose nerves Blake and Mitch often get on.
Dale Myers (Derek Dressler) — Blake's father, and co-owner of the family travel business, "Let's Travel!"
Darla Myers (Tarah Consoli) — Blake's Mother, and co-owner of "Let's Travel!"
Rodrigo de la Cruz — Mitch's father who is also a skilled inventor
Carmen de la Cruz (Yeni Álvarez) — Mitch's mother who organizes the town's block parties
Dr. Björn Gunderson — Skye's father who is the resident dentist and like her he also has gap teeth
Isabelle Gunderson — Skye's mother
Sunshine Gunderson — Skye's baby sister
Fast Eddy —  Zorka's pet Miniature bull terrier that keeps protecting his lawn

Broadcast
Get Blake! was originally going to premiere on Nickelodeon in the United States in April 2015, but instead began to air on Nicktoons on April 20, 2016. The series premiered on Nickelodeon in Africa on April 6 but later moved to Nicktoons in Africa from November 2 for new episodes and on Nickelodeon in Australia and New Zealand on May 17. In Arabia, it is being broadcast on both Nickelodeon and Nicktoons. It also airs on ABC Me in Australia.

Episodes

References

External links
 
 Production website

2016 American television series debuts
2016 American television series endings
2010s American animated television series
2015 French television series debuts
2015 French television series endings
2010s French animated television series
American children's animated comic science fiction television series
French children's animated comic science fiction television series
American flash animated television series
French flash animated television series
English-language television shows
Nickelodeon original programming
Nicktoons (TV network) original programming
Teen animated television series
Television series by Banijay